SS Harold A. Jordan was a Liberty ship built in the United States during World War II. She was named after Harold A. Jordan, a Merchant seaman killed on the cargo ship , 17 June 1942, when she was

Construction
Harold A. Jordan was laid down on 30 November 1944, under a Maritime Commission (MARCOM) contract, MC hull 2514, by the St. Johns River Shipbuilding Company, Jacksonville, Florida; she was sponsored by Mrs. William H. Jordan, the mother of the namesake, and she was launched on 6 January 1945.

History
She was allocated to the Parry Navigation Co., on 17 January 1945. On 26 September 1947, she was laid up in the National Defense Reserve Fleet, Wilmington, North Carolina. She was sold for scrapping, 30 October 1954, to Union Minerals & Alloys Corp., for $48,129.79. She was removed from the fleet, 31 December 1964.

References

Bibliography

 
 
 
 
 

 

Liberty ships
Ships built in Jacksonville, Florida
1945 ships
Wilmington Reserve Fleet